Thomas Hopper may refer to:

Thomas Hopper (architect) (1776–1856), English architect
Thomas Hopper (cricketer) (1828–1877), English cricketer
Thomas Hopper (footballer), English footballer
Tom Hopper (Thomas Edward Hopper, born 1985), English actor
Tom Hopper (footballer) (Thomas Edward Hopper, born 1993), English footballer